This is a list of years in the People's Republic of China.

Twentieth century

Twenty-first century 

Years of the 20th century in China
Years of the 21st century in China